Alexander (June 1, 1999 – June 2022), known online as Technoblade, was an American YouTuber known for his Minecraft videos, livestreams, and involvement in the Dream SMP. Technoblade registered his main channel on YouTube in 2013. His content focused on Minecraft gameplay, particularly on the minigame server Hypixel. After rising to popularity in 2019 for his performances in player versus player events, Technoblade was invited to the Dream SMP Minecraft server in 2020, further increasing his following. He is widely regarded by the game's community as one of the best Minecraft players.

Technoblade died of metastatic sarcoma in June 2022, which prompted widespread reactions across both the Minecraft and YouTube communities. At the time of his death, his main YouTube channel had reached nearly 11 million subscribers.

Internet career 
Technoblade first registered and began uploading on his main YouTube channel on October 28, 2013. Its content focused mainly on the video game Minecraft, particularly gameplay on the minigame server Hypixel. In a video from 2017, Technoblade beat Minecraft on hardcore mode using a racing wheel controller. In another series of videos, beginning with "The Great Potato War", he tried to produce the highest amount of potatoes in the Hypixel gamemode Skyblock competing against rival im_a_squid_kid.

Technoblade rose in popularity in 2019, following multiple wins in Keemstar's "Minecraft Monday" tournaments in which he defeated multiple prominent content creators in combat. Technoblade also regularly participated in the Minecraft Championship (MCC) tournaments with other YouTubers and won two of them. According to Cale Michael of Dot Esports, he was widely regarded as among the best Minecraft content creators, especially in player versus player (PVP) events.

Technoblade became a member of the Dream SMP in 2020, a Minecraft server hosted by the YouTuber Dream which features numerous popular Minecraft YouTubers. He began frequently creating content and livestreams on the server. Technoblade had a friendly rivalry with Dream, and they were both generally regarded as among the best Minecraft players. In September 2021, Technoblade raised over $300,000 for the Sarcoma Foundation of America through a charity livestream, passing the $250,000 goal within two hours.

Around the time of his death in June 2022, Technoblade's channel had reached 10.8 million subscribers. In August 2022, it posthumously reached fifteen million subscribers.

Personal life 
Born on June 1, 1999, Technoblade resided in San Francisco, California. He was known to have had ADHD. In a 2019 video, he revealed he had begun attending college as an English major, but dropped out to play Minecraft full-time.

Throughout his career, Technoblade avoided personal inquiries and interviews to maintain his and his family's privacy, although he occasionally discussed his personal life in his videos. His family continued to decline interviews after his death. By his own admission, Technoblade pranked his viewers into believing his name was "Dave" in 2016. This was generally accepted as his real name until the announcement of his death, in which he revealed his name was Alexander.

Cancer diagnosis and death 

In a video, released on August 27, 2021, Technoblade disclosed that he was diagnosed with cancer after noticing pain in his right arm and a bump on his shoulder. In response, Dream donated  to cancer research. Chemotherapy and radiation therapy proved unsuccessful. His oncologist stated that his arm would potentially need to be amputated. In December 2021, he underwent a successful limb salvage operation. Technoblade encouraged his fans to wear face masks and become vaccinated against COVID-19, as it was relevant to his immunodeficiency at the time.

On June 30, 2022, at 21:29 EDT, a video titled "so long nerds" was uploaded to Technoblade's YouTube channel, in which his father announced that Technoblade had died from the cancer. He read a message written by Technoblade eight hours before he died and said that future proceeds from merchandising and videos would go to the Sarcoma Foundation of America and his siblings' college educations. The video ended with a written message from Technoblade's mother. Technoblade originally planned on writing and recording the video himself but was unable to do so as a result of his worsening condition.

Although Technoblade never stated the specific type of his cancer, he had previously raised $500,000 for the Sarcoma Foundation of America throughout his YouTube career. Several publications reported that Technoblade had died of metastatic sarcoma, and the Foundation acknowledged in a press release that Technoblade had been diagnosed with sarcoma.

It was later revealed by the Sarcoma Foundation of America that Technoblade was diagnosed with a stage 4 unspecific type of sarcoma (chest scans revealed metastasis to both lungs) when the painful bump on his shoulder got checked.

Reactions and tributes 

The announcement of his death became the top trending video on YouTube later that day. It remained on the trending tab for several days and surpassed 30 million views in the first 24 hours. By the end of August 2022, it had been viewed over 80 million times and liked over 8 million times, becoming the most viewed and most liked video on Technoblade's channel. The video was recognized as the most watched video on YouTube in 2022, with 87 million views. Technoblade posthumously reached fifteen million subscribers in August 2022.

YouTubers such as Dream and other members of the Dream SMP expressed their condolences, support, and admiration for him online. Simon Collins-Laflamme, the co-founder of Hypixel, and business magnate Elon Musk expressed similar feelings. YouTube tweeted its condolences to his family, friends, and fans following the release of the video. The official Minecraft Twitter account also tweeted its condolences, and the Sarcoma Foundation of America sent its support to the family by creating a special tribute on their website. Polygon described Technoblade as "one of Minecraft most celebrated personalities".

In an interview with The New York Times, Don Pireso, Hypixel's lead administrator, stated that Technoblade's family would not be providing any further comments regarding his death beyond what they were comfortable sharing in the video. The Hypixel team also established a digital space in its Minecraft server where fans could use the in-game book and quill item to write one-page messages until August 2022. Over 377,000 messages were printed across 22 volumes, which were delivered to Technoblade's family by Hypixel Studios CEO Noxy, alongside a volume of fan-made artwork, a fan-made oil painting of Technoblade, and a Technoblade-themed cosplay headpiece, all created in memory of Technoblade.

On July 2, 2022, Mojang Studios added a tribute to Technoblade in the launcher image of Minecraft: Java Edition. The modified image added a crown to a pig, in reference to Technoblade's in-game Minecraft skin and channel branding. The tribute was removed one month later when the image was replaced to promote Minecraft's Wild Update. After fans had suggested the addition, Mojang added a new splash text—"Technoblade never dies!"—to the Minecraft main menu. In an email to The New York Times, Mojang Studios wrote that Technoblade "became synonymous with a source of good".

On October 28, 2022, nine years after the creation of the Technoblade YouTube channel, YouTube uploaded an eight-minute video to its official channel commemorating Technoblade's ninth anniversary entitled "Technoblade Never Dies". YouTube revealed that since his death in June, an average of 300 new videos with the same catchphrase in the title are uploaded daily. On the same day, a video was uploaded by MrBeast which is believed to be the last video that Technoblade participated in.

Notes

References

External links 

 
 

1999 births
2022 deaths
Deaths from cancer in the United States
English-language YouTube channels
Entertainers from California
Minecraft YouTubers
People from San Francisco
Place of birth missing
Place of death missing
YouTube channels launched in 2013
People with attention deficit hyperactivity disorder